The 1926 Los Angeles Buccaneers season was their only season in the league. The team finished 6–3–1, tying for sixth place in the league.

Schedule

Standings

References

Los Angeles Buccaneers seasons
Los Angeles Buccaneers